GHUM are a London-based post punk band, formed in 2016. They released their debut album, Bitter, in June 2022.

History

GHUM consist of Laura Guerrero Lora (vocals), Marina MJ (bass), Jojo Khor (guitar)
and Vicki Ann (drums). They met after Marina placed an advertisement on 
Gumtree seeking bandmates.

They released their first EP, Ghum in 2017; their second, The Coldest Fire was released in 2019, backed with a UK tour in July 2019. The EP came to national media attention, with the band doing a BBC Introducing session and lead track "Saturn" being playlisted by BBC Radio 6 Music. The band's follow-up single "California", released January 2020, was debuted on the Steve Lamacq show on BBC Radio 6 Music  and featured on his 6 Music Recommends playlist. The song was named one of the '20 best rock songs right now' by The Fader.

Bands GHUM have played with include Dream Wife and L.A. Witch. After seeing them, Alice Go of Dream Wife contributed a remix of their 2018 single "I'm the Storm".

In March 2022 GHUM released lead new single "Some People", from their debut album Bitter, which was released on June 17, 2022. "Some People" was followed by "Bitter" in May 2022 and title track "Bad Brain" in June 2022. The album was described by Line of Best Fit as "a taut nine song masterclass".. The band in June 2022 in Europe supporting Soft Kill and Choir Boy. 

Later in 2022 saw GHUM be announced as tour support for Big Joanie's UK tour in 2023., and the announcement of their first North American appearances in March 2023: at South By Southwest and a festival in New York.

Discography

Albums
Bitter - Everything Sucks, 12" LP, CD, Cassette, MP3 (2022)

Extended plays
Ghum - Self released, MP3 (2017)
The Coldest Fire - Everything Sucks, 12" EP, MP3 (2019)

Singles
"I'm the Storm" / "Undone"- Everything Sucks, Cassette, MP3 (2018)
"California"- Everything Sucks, MP3 (2020)
"Some People" - Everything Sucks, MP3 (2022)
"Bitter" - Everything Sucks, MP3 (2022)
"Bad Brains" - Everything Sucks, MP3 (2022)

References

Musical groups established in 2016
Post-punk revival music groups
2016 establishments in England
Musical groups from London